The Yungas (Aymara yunka warm or temperate Andes or earth, Quechua yunka warm area on the slopes of the Andes) is a bioregion of a narrow band of forest along the eastern slope of the Andes Mountains from Peru and Bolivia, and extends into Northwest Argentina at the slope of the Andes pre-cordillera. It is a transitional zone between the Andean highlands and the eastern forests. Like the surrounding areas, the Yungas belong to the Neotropical realm; the climate is rainy, humid, and warm.

Setting 
The Yungas forests are extremely diverse, ranging from moist lowland forest to evergreen montane forest and cloud forests. The terrain, formed by valleys, fluvial mountain trails and streams, is extremely rugged and varied, contributing to the ecological diversity and richness. A complex mosaic of habitats occur with changing latitude as well as elevation. There are high levels of biodiversity and species endemism throughout the Yungas regions. Many of the forests are evergreen, and the South Andean Yungas contains what may be the last evergreen forests resulting from Quaternary glaciations.

World Wildlife ecoregions 
The World Wide Fund for Nature has delineated three yungas ecoregions along the eastern side of the Andes:
 The northernmost is the Peruvian Yungas, located entirely within Peru and stretching nearly the whole length of the country.
 The Bolivian Yungas lies to the south, entirely within Bolivia. The Cordillera Apolobamba marks the boundary between the Peruvian Yungas and Bolivian Yungas.
 The Southern Andean Yungas begins in southern Bolivia and continues to the north of Argentina. It is a humid forest region between the drier Gran Chaco region to the east and the dry, high altitude Puna region to the west.

Yungas are transitional zones between the Andean highlands and the eastern forests. The yungas forests are extremely diverse, ranging from moist lowland forest to evergreen montane forest and cloud forests. The terrain is extremely rugged and varied, contributing to the ecological diversity and richness. A complex mosaic of habitats occur with changing latitude as well as elevation. There are high levels of biodiversity and species endemism throughout the yungas regions. Many of the forests are evergreen, and the South Andean Yungas contains what may be the last evergreen forests resulting from Quaternary glaciations.

Climate
The average temperature is 72 °F (22 °C). The climate is varied and ranges from a humid tropical to the cold of the Andes over 10,000 ft (3,000 m).

Peruvian Yungas

In Peru there is a difference between Yunga and Yungas. Yunga is considered a natural region on both sides of the Peruvian Andes, the western side towards the coast is called Sea Yunga, and the eastern side into the jungle is called Fluvial Yunga, both reach a height of 2,300 m.

Instead, Yungas is the ecoregion of rain forest and montane forest from 1.000 to 3.500 m, so it is limited to the eastern side of the Andes. This concept has a closer analogy with the Bolivian Yungas. This region is considered as the most endemic biodiversity of Peru.

Forest loss in the Peruvian Yungas has sharply accelerated since the 2000s, rising seven-fold between 2005 and late 2012, according to satellite analysis by Terra-i.

Sea Yunga
Sea Yunga, or Maritime Yunga, is found between 500 and 2,300 m and it is situated between the eastern part of the coastal strip and the western part of the Highlands. This subregion has a subtropical desert climate with little rainfall along the central and southern coast (drier as you go south).

The flora in the central Sea Yungas region is mainly composed by the lucuma and cherimoya trees, the casuarin, and others.

Once you go north its climate becomes subtropical in the vicinity of La Libertad, Lambayeque and Piura.

As this area approaches the tropics, fauna differs from the rest of the coast, so that animals like the boas, larger reptiles and the famous white-winged guan (a bird species unique to this Peruvian ecoregion) occur here. Common trees in this area are the faique, the sapote, the zapayal, the barrigon and other thorny tropical savanna trees of the equatorial dry forests on the northern coast of Piura and Tumbes.

The cooler Pacific side is more vaguely characterized. The dry and cool Yunga Coastal begins at 500 m above sea level. The Maritime Yunga begins dry, and it seems to follow ecotone on ecotone until reaching the Quechua region at the Pacific side.

Fluvial Yunga 
This sub-region has a subtropical climate with ample seasonal rains. The average temperature fluctuates between 20 °C and 25 °C depending on the altitude (max 35 °C, min 11 °C).

Concept:

The concept of the east side of the continental divide is straightforward: 1,000 m above sea level it is 4.9 °C cooler, and the subtropical cloud forest (Fluvial Yunga) follows the tropical rainforest (Anti). At 2,300 m, the climate transitions from subtropical climate to temperate climate (Quechua). The Tree line ends at 3,500 m and has an annual mean temperature of 10 °C. The region between the tree line and 4,000 m is called Suni or Jalca. Suni is a dry and cold region with many glacial valleys. Despite the harsh weather, crops such as quinoa, maca, qañiwa, broad beans and ulluku are cultivated here.

Flora and fauna 
The flora (subtropical cloud forest) of the Yunga region is mainly composed by the Peruvian pepper tree, the Furcraea, white cabuya (Furcraea andina), the pitahaya and the Peruvian torch cactus (Echinopsis peruviana).  The coca leaf is established in this region as well as the uña de gato ("cat's claw", Uncaria tomentosa). The most attractive sites of this warm refreshing region are its many orchid forests and beautiful valleys. The fauna in the Yunga region is characterized by the long-tailed mockingbird, or chaucato.

Overview 
Andean Continental Divide

Mountain Top:

 Mountain passes – 4,100 m
 Puna grassland
 Closed vegetation
 Sporadic vegetation
 Andean-alpine desert
 Snow line – about 5,000 m
 Janca – Rocks, Snow and Ice
 Peak

Bolivian Yungas

Human use
In the early 20th century, the region was a major source for rubber and quinine. Now, coffee, citrus, and coca are important crops. People cultivate native plants like the canistel or eggfruit tree the lúcuma tree, the cherimoya or chirimoya, the guava or guayabo and the avocado or palta.

The Afro Bolivian community is concentrated here.

The Yungas Cocalera Revolution is based in the region. Its name derives from the one applied for the same mountain level by those who study the economic system of the prehispanic Andes.

The Yungas also contains one of the most deadly roads in the world, called the "camino de la muerte," or Highway of Death.

Due to the mountainous terrain an entrepreneurial coca harvester created a network of zip lines that permit rapid travel from peak to peak by farmers, referred to locally as flying men or bird men, along with their harvests using zip line trollies.

Argentine Yungas

See also
 Tropical Andes
 Geography of Bolivia
 Yungas Road, North road: 3,600 to 4,650 m (La Cumbre pass, Bolivia), then to 330 m in 61–69 km
 Peruvian Amazon
 Natural regions of Peru
 Climate zones by altitude
 Altitudinal zonation

References

Other sources
 Endemic Bird Areas for the Bolivian and Peruvian upper yungas and the Bolivian and Peruvian lower yungas. BirdLife International, 2003. BirdLife's online World Bird Database. Version 2.0. Cambridge, UK.
 
 
 

 
Ecoregions of the Andes
Andean forests
Montane ecology
Tropical Andes
Upper Amazon
Ecoregions of South America
Ecoregions of Argentina
Ecoregions of Bolivia
Ecoregions of Peru
Geography of Bolivia
Physiographic regions of Peru
Regions of Argentina
Natural history of Argentina
Natural history of Bolivia
Natural history of Peru
Natural regions of South America
Regions of Bolivia
Ecoregions
Regions of Peru